Chrysis is a very large genus of cuckoo wasps (insects in the family Chrysididae). It is the largest genus in the family, including over 1,000 species in over 20 subgenera, as speciose as all remaining Chrysididae combined. The generic name is derived from Greek chrysis, "gold vessel, gold-embroidered dress", and pays tribute to the brilliant metallic appearance of wasps in the genus.

Gallery

Selected species

References 

 Biolib

Bibliography 

 

Chrysidinae
Hymenoptera genera